The House at 200 West North Avenue in Pittsburgh, Pennsylvania was built in 1890 in the Queen Anne style. The house was likely built for Jasper M. Porter the Secretary/Treasurer of the Savage Fire-Brick Company. He owned the property until 1903. The house was listed on the National Register of Historic Places in 1986.

References

Houses on the National Register of Historic Places in Pennsylvania
Queen Anne architecture in Pennsylvania
Houses completed in 1890
Houses in Pittsburgh
National Register of Historic Places in Pittsburgh